Akleh (also known as Aquel and Hareyān Akleh) is a village in Mofatteh Rural District, in the Central District of Famenin County, Hamadan Province, Iran. At the 2006 census, its population was 413, in 99 families.

References 

Populated places in Famenin County